Kirkham (originally Kirkam-in-Amounderness) is a town and civil parish in the Borough of Fylde in Lancashire, England, midway between Blackpool and Preston ( west of Preston) and adjacent to the smaller town of Wesham. It owes its existence to Carr Hill upon which it was built and which was the location of a Roman fort. At the census of 2011, it had a population 7,194.

History

In his 1878 History of the Fylde of Lancashire, John Porter described Kirkham as ".. probably the earliest inhabited locality in the Fylde district." Remains found at Carleton in the 1970s of an elk with two harpoons embedded suggest that the Fylde was inhabited as long ago as 8,000 BC.

The town is pre-Roman in its origin with a name originating from the Danish kirk (church) and -ham (Saxon for settlement, or "home"). The town owes its existence to Carr Hill upon which it was built and which was the location of a Roman fort. It appears in the Domesday Book of 1086 under the name of Chicheham and is described as lying on the Roman road between Ribchester (Bremetennacum) and the River Wyre. The town's market charter was granted in 1269–70 by King Henry III.

In the 15th and 16th centuries Kirkham remained a small market town. But from the late 17th century the town grew into a thriving textile centre. From 1830 sailcloth was being woven in cottages in the town and later at the Flax Mill, built in 1861 by John Birley. Kirkham Grammar School was founded in 1549 but the original building no longer exists.

In 1792 a Roman brass shield boss was discovered by local schoolmaster John Willacy, in the Dow Brook, in Mill Hill Field. Willacy sold the shield to a Scotsman, but it found its way to the Charles Townley collection in Burnley and from there to the British Museum.

In 1887 a memorial was erected, at Town End, to commemorate the Golden Jubilee of Queen Victoria. The memorial was later moved to a site adjacent to the United Reformed Church.

Looms ran in the town from about 1850 until 2003. At one time the town had eleven mills, the last to be built being Progress Mill in 1915. On the lower part of Station Road "The Last Loom" of Kirkham is on permanent public display. This loom, a cross-rod type from the 1920s, with the use of tappets at the side, could produce an extensive range of fabrics including velvets, twills and Bedford cord.

In 1925, Church Street became the subject of a pencil on paper drawing by Pendlebury artist L. S. Lowry In his later "A Lancashire Village, 1935" he painted the scene again, but with a wider street full of people and a house in front of the church.

Due to an expansion of secondary education after the Second World War, in 1957 Carr Hill Secondary Modern (now Carr Hill 11 to 18 High School and Sixth Form Centre), was built on the site of Carr Hill House and a former racecourse. It was officially opened in 1958 by the Duchess of Kent. Several housing developments have been built on the edge of the town in the last half of the 20th century.

Demographics, economy
The 2011 Census showed that 7,194 people lived in Kirkham.

Banks 
The Kirkham branch of HSBC closed in 2015 and that of Nat West closed in 2017. The branch of Lloyds Bank also closed in 2017, the branch of Santander closed in October 2018 and the branch of Royal Bank of Scotland closed in January 2019, leaving Kirkham with no bank branches at all. The town has one remaining building society agent, for Yorkshire Building Society on Poulton Street.

Pubs and dining 
There are several pubs in Kirkham, five of which are within or very close to the town centre including the Black Horse, Queen's Arms, the Swan and the Stable Bar. The Tap & Vent brewhouse, operated by Lytham Brewery, on Poulton Street, opened in December 2017.

The Bullhorn Smokehouse opened in March 2021 and is located on Poulton Street. The Old Bank, a fine dining venue, was opened by restauranteur Andrew Booker and his son James, in the premises of the former Midland/HSBC bank in 2021 In February 2022 the former premises of the Santander bank were used as the home for the new German Brewhaus. Indulge Dessert Bar opened, on Market Square, on 30 March 2000.

Regeneration
In 2022 Fylde Borough Council purchased Grade II listed Hillside on Preston Street and the former Lloyds bank on Poulton Street, as part of the town's £10m regeneration plan, Kirkham Futures. Hillside was a former restaurant and popular wedding venue, but both buildings have been empty for some years. The former bank, which was originally a Charity Girls School dating back to 1860, is hoped to be converted into a community cinema.

Kirkham Futures is a four-year plan, led by Fylde Council's regeneration team, in partnership with Lancashire County Council and Kirkham Town Council, which will use a £6.3m grant from the Government’s Future High Streets Fund (FHSF).

Education
Kirkham has two secondary schools: Carr Hill High School a mixed comprehensive school, and Kirkham Grammar School, an independent school. Feeding into these two schools are the primary schools of Kirkham: Kirkham and Wesham Primary School, Kirkham Grammar Junior School, St John the Evangelist (also known as "The Willows") Catholic Primary School, Kirkham St Michael's C of E Primary School and Pear Tree Specialist School (for special requirements in physical and sensory).

Churches

The Church of England parish church is St Michael's whose minister is Reverend Rick Bunday. There is also a Roman Catholic church – St John the Evangelist, built in 1845, but known locally as "The Willows" – on the Ribby Road, a United Reformed Church on Poulton Street, a Methodist church on Nelson Street.

Zion (Independent) Chapel was founded in 1818. Although the church has long since been demolished, the graveyard remains. Now associated with Kirkham United Reformed Church, but adjacent to the Manse Nursing Home in the centre of the town, this unusual isolated burial-ground is still well maintained.

Location and amenities
Kirkham lies at the centre of a relatively rich agricultural area. By the mid 18th century, however, the manufacture of sail cloth and the flax-weaving industry had become well established in the town. By 1876 there were several factories employing almost 1,000 workers in the cotton and other industries and by the end of the century the town had grown considerably in importance.

Kirkham and Wesham railway station was opened in 1840 as "Kirkham Station", when the Preston and Wyre Railway and Harbour Company opened its line to Fleetwood. South of the town is Kirkham Prison, an open prison built on part of the site of the Royal Air Force base which closed in 1957.

The small library located on Station Road has been open since 1939 and has recently reopened following a major refurbishment.

The town is served by its own free newspaper, the Kirkham and Wesham Advertiser. Both the Blackpool Gazette and the Lancashire Evening Post cover Kirkham news, as does the weekly Kirkham and Fylde Express. Regular bus services are provided by the Ribble branch of Stagecoach Buses and Coastal Coaches.

Kirkham Club Day, an annual gala, is held in early June, jointly with Wesham. The day involves the various churches and their chosen "Rose Queens", together with biblical tableau floats, civic dignitaries and brass bands, walking in procession through the town in the morning.

The town's War Memorial is located in a small memorial garden on Barnfield.

The St George Hotel was situated at the bottom on Station Road, at Town End, but closed in 2011 and was demolished in 2012 to make way for a block of flats.

In January 2021 Bradley's Bar, located inside AFC Fylde's Mill Farm Stadium, was converted to become one of the North West's COVID-19 vaccination centres. The facility was adapted to meet the necessary standards to allow a safe and efficient delivery of the vaccine whilst critically maintaining social distancing requirements.

Sport

Kirkham Swimming Baths was erected in 1908 by the bequest of William Segar Hodgson J.P. and has served Kirkham as a public swimming pool for over a century. Open seven days a week, galas, free children swims and adult-only swims are regularly held. In February 2008 a campaign was initiated to save the baths from closure. This included a public march through Kirkham and Wesham on 1 March attended by some 3,000 local supporters A local action group was subsequently formed to organise the longer term survival of the baths, and was successful in presenting a business plan to Fylde Borough Council. The baths, now run by the YMCA, has been re-branded as "Rural Splash".

The town's football club is AFC Fylde. The club was known as Kirkham and Wesham F.C until the end of the 2007–08 season, and was formed by the amalgamation of Kirkham Town F.C. and Wesham F.C. The change of name to AFC Fylde was made to try to encourage a broader fan-base from across the Fylde coast.

AFC Fylde is currently based north of Wesham on the Mill Farm complex and plays in the National League. The team won the FA Vase in the 2007–08 season, beating Lowestoft Town in the final at Wembley Stadium on 11 May 2008. They were also promoted to the North West Counties Football League Premier Division after finishing second in Division Two. In 2008–09 they were North West Counties Football League champions and so won promotion to the Northern Premier League Division One North.

In May 2022 the British Lawn Mower Racing Association staged a meeting at Sunfield Farm, off Freckleton Road, to help to raise money for Ukraine.

Twin towns
Kirkham is twinned with both Ancenis in Loire-Atlantique, France and Bad Brückenau, a spa town in Bad Kissingen district, northern Bavaria which is situated in the Rhön Mountains in Germany. Kirkham has an active Twinning Association and has regular contact with both Ancenis and Bad Brückenau.

Places of interest
Kirkham currently has 20 listed buildings, one of them being Grade II* and the rest being Grade II. Many of the buildings in the town centre date from the Georgian and Victorian eras.
St Michaels Church, Kirkham
Kirkham United Reformed Church
Ash Tree House - Formerly a house but now a general practice
Kirkham Windmill (now a private residence)
Kirkham Grammar School
St John the Evangelist R.C Church (known locally as the Willows Church)
Kirkham Baths, Station Road
Kirkham and Wesham Railway Station
Kirkham Library, Station Road
Central Green, Station Road

References

Further reading
Ramsbottom, M. (2013), Around Kirkham through Time, Stroud, Amberley Publishing 
Ramsbottom, M. (2013), An Historical Tour around the Town of Kirkham, Kirkham, (self-published)

External links

 A comprehensive history of Kirkham
 Historic Town Assessment Report (Archaeological and Historical Report)
 Roman Roads in Lancashire
 Geograph images of Kirkham
 Kirkham Twinning Association
 Kirkham Methodist Church

Towns in Lancashire
Geography of the Borough of Fylde